The Sphinctrinaceae are a family of fungi in the order Mycocaliciales.

References

Eurotiomycetes
Ascomycota families
Taxa described in 1950
Taxa named by Maurice Choisy